Seo Jin-su (born 18 October 2000) is a South Korean footballer currently playing as a forward for Jeju United.

Career statistics

Club

Notes

References

2000 births
Living people
South Korean footballers
Association football forwards
K League 1 players
Jeju United FC players